Christian Søren Nielsen (7 April 1873 – 7 November 1952) was a Danish sailor who competed in the 1924 Summer Olympics. In 1924 he won the silver medal as crew member of the Danish boat Bonzo in the 6 metre class event.

References

External links
 
 
 

1873 births
1952 deaths
Danish male sailors (sport)
Olympic sailors of Denmark
Olympic medalists in sailing
Olympic silver medalists for Denmark
Sailors at the 1924 Summer Olympics – 6 Metre
Medalists at the 1924 Summer Olympics